André Butzer (born in 1973 in Stuttgart), is a German painter.

Biography
Butzer was born in Stuttgart, West Germany and lives in Rangsdorf near Berlin. He makes semi-abstract paintings that feature cartoon-like characters and objects. Butzer is interested in the comic genre, whose ambivalence comes on the one hand from a childlike inflation of effect and on the other hand from an artificial lifelessness, set beyond morality.  Butzer’s work has been called Science-Fiction-Expressionism, he is influenced by James Ensor, Willem de Kooning, and Phillip Guston.  In 1997, he helped to found Akademie Isotrop in Hamburg.

Butzer is represented by Galerie Max Hetzler in Berlin, with whom he has exhibited with since 2003, and Nino Mier Gallery in Los Angeles.

Selected exhibitions

2014
 "André Butzer / Christian Eisenberger", Künstlerhaus KM–, Halle für Kunst & Medien, Graz

2011
 "andré butzer | der wahrscheinlich beste abstrakte maler der welt", Kestner Gesellschaft, Hannover
 "André Butzer", Carbon 12 Dubai

2007
 "Niveaualarm" (with Klaus Auderer, Bara, Katja Barth, Hanna-Mari Blencke, Lutz Braun, Ben Cottrell, Bjorn Dahlem, Matthias Dornfeld, Axel Geis, Patrycja German, Michael Hackel, Thomas Helbig, Gregor Hildebrandt, Andreas Hofer, Leiko Ikemura, Franka Kassner, Erwin Kneihsl, Maja Körner, Anna Kolodziejska, Gabriel Kondratiuk, Kitty Kraus, Alicja Kwade, Katrin Plavcak, Emanuel Seitz, Markus Selg, Astrid Sourkova, Lorenz Straßl, Frank Lucy Tonke, Remco Torenbosch, Joep van Liefland, Aribert von Ostrowski, Iskender Yediler, Thomas Zipp, etc.) kuratiert von Ulrich Wulff, Kunstraum Innsbruck
 "Imagination Becomes Reality. Eine Ausstellung zum erweiterten Malereibegriff. Werke aus der Sammlung Goetz", ZKM Museum für Neue Kunst, Karlsruhe, Germany
 "Kommando Friedrich Hölderlin Berlin", Galerie Max Hetzler, Berlin, Germany (cat.)
 Alison Jacques Gallery, London
 Gary Tatintsian Gallery, Inc., Moscow
 Friedens-Siemense (Teil 2), Galerie Guido W. Baudach, Berlin
 Hitz ond Brand, Ortsmuseum Wolfhalden, Appenzellerland / Swiss Kommando Calvin
 Cohn, New York, salon 94, New York

2006
 "Imagination Become Reality: Ein mehrteiliger Ausstellungszyklus zum Bildverständnis aktueller Kunst. Part IV: Borrowed Images", Sammlung Goetz, Munich, Germany
 "Amerikanische Technik im Jahr 2017", Patrick Painter Gallery, Los Angeles
 Galerie Bernd Kugler, Austria
 "Griessbrei für alle!", Galerie Max Hetzler, Berlin

2005
 "La nouvelle peinture Allemande", Carré d’art-Musée d’art contemporain De Nîmes, Nîmes

2004
 "Heimweh", Haunch of Venison, London
 "Galerie Bernd Kugler", Innsbruck

2003
 "Todall!", Galerie Hamelehle und Ahrens, Cologne

2002
 "Friedens-Siemense (Part 1)", Galerie Gabriele Senn, Vienna
 "Wanderung nach Annaheim", Maschenmode, Galerie Guido W. Baudach, Berlin

2001
 "Galerie Hammelehle und Ahrens", Stuttgart (with Markus Selg)

2000
 "Akademie Isotrop", Galerie Daniel Buchholz, Cologne
 "Der Realismus bereut nichts!", Contemporary Fine Arts, Berlin

1999
 "Ich bin Munch", Galerie Esther Freund, Vienna

Collections
 Scharpff Collection
 Taschen Collection
 Goetz Collection
 Rubell Collection
 Colección Lázaro

See also
 List of German painters

External links
 Andre Butzer’s official site
 andrebutzer.com (website about the artist and his work)
 artfacts.net
 Galerie Guido W. Baudach
 Carbon 12 Dubai
 Galerie Max Hetzler
 Xippas Gallery
 Bernd Kugler Gallery
 Patrick Painter Gallery
 Giò Marconi Gallery
 Metro Pictures Gallery
Interview with Andre Butzer from the Academy of Visual Arts in Leipzig
Images, biography and texts about Andre Butzer from the Saatchi Gallery
Andre Butzer at Berliner Poster Verlag

References

20th-century German painters
20th-century German male artists
German male painters
21st-century German painters
21st-century German male artists
1973 births
Living people